Yeong-gam or Younggam (hangul:영감, in hanja:令監) is a nickname or Korean honorific for an old man in Korea. Yeong-gam was historically an honorific title for second-level and third-level civil servants; Vice-Minister, Assistant Secretary of the Korean Goryeo Dynasty and Joseon dynasties.

Over time the word became an honorific or nickname for a judge, county governor, head of a township or old man. In recent years, yeong-gam has come to be used primarily as a nickname for elderly men. Yeong-gam has been used in Korea for more than a thousand years.

History

Yeong-gam was first used as an honorific for a lower level civil servants  of the Goryeo Dynasty and Joseon dynasties, though the first instance of its use is unknown. Nyeong-gam(녕감, 령감), was the first spelling used for this name, it was later changed to yeong-gam. The term yeong-gam comes after public office and peerage titles in a man's name. 

In the Joseon dynasty, men over their 80th birthday were bestowed the honorary position Assistant Secretary. At their 90th birthday they were given the honorary position of Vice-Minister. 

With the fall of Joseon, the position of 'Sang-gam(상감)'. Along with the change in the meaning of these positions, Korean patriarchal perspectives were added to the usages of young-gam, which became a common designation; 1. When judges refer to each other 2. When others who are not judges refer to judges 3. When people refer to the mayor 4. When people refer to their elders 5. When women refer to their husbands.
 
After the Joseon dynasty, the use of yeong-gam continued in Japan and Colonial Korea as an honorific for the position of country governor, judge, prosecutor, and district attorney.

Modern usage
After 1962, the Supreme Court of South Korea sought to eliminate the habit of using the term ‘Young-gam’ for judges since it was considered to be an anti-democratic thought. In modern Korea 'Young-gam’ is commonly used as a suffix that comes after the last name of elderly men.

During the Goryeo Dynasty and Joseon dynasties yeong-gam followed one's title, in modern use yeong-gam is used by itself.

Homographs

Young-gam is a homograph. It is not only a title for elderly men, it means 'inspiration' in Korean (Hangul).

See also
 Anti-democratic thought
 Goryeo
 Joseon
 Joseon Dynasty politics
 Korean honorific
 Seungji

References

External links
 삼도수군통제사 이순신 조선시대 고위직 '종2품' hangyorye 2005.02.20 
 ‘영감’에 깃든 우리말 변천사 한국경제 2011/03/25 
 [한마당-염성덕] 영감과 영감탱이 국민일보 2010.09.13
 [엽기인물 한국사] 5. 조선의 국제적 포주② 스포츠경향 2007년 09월 17일 
 일상에 남은 옛말의 흔적 한국경제 2011/04/01 
 국민을 봉취급 막말엘리트 판검사 영감님 브레이크뉴스 
 [한마당-염성덕] 영감과 영감탱이 2010.09.13 
 [성석제의 길위의 이야기] 대감과 마누라 한국일보

Society of South Korea
South Korean culture
History of Korea
Goryeo
Joseon dynasty
Korea under Japanese rule
Popular culture language